Muhammad Haroon Aslam  is a retired 3-Star general of Pakistan Army. He was the Chief of Logistics Staff (CLS), of Pakistan Army.

Education 
He holds master's degrees in Defence Studies and Political Science. Haroon Aslam is a graduate of Command and Staff College Quetta, Defence Services Command and Staff College (Bangladesh) and National Defence University Islamabad.

Commands held 
In the past he served as Director Military Operations, commanded Pakistan Army's (Special Service Group). He also served as Corps Commander Bahawalpur from Mar 2011 to Jan 2013.

In Swat he led Operation Rah-e-Rast. Under his command the SSG, during Operation Black Thunderstorm, liberated the Piochar Valley in Swat, which was occupied by terrorists. He was due to retire on 9 April 2014 but he retired on 27 November 2013 when Lt Gen Raheel Sharif was appointed as COAS.

Currently he is serving as chairman Board Human Resource & Remuneration Committee &  Board of Director (Askari Bank), managing director of Fauji Foundation, CE & MD  of Fauji Fertilizer Bin Qasim Limited Fauji Foods Ltd (formerly Noon Pakistan Ltd), Fauji Meat Ltd, FFBL Coal Power Company Ltd.

Awards and decorations

Foreign decorations

References

5. Board of director askari bank

Pakistani generals
Living people
Year of birth missing (living people)